Mohd Fakrul Aiman bin Sidid (born 12 August 1989) is a Malaysian professional footballer who plays as a winger.

Club career

PKNS (loan)
Fakrul joined PKNS on loan in August 2012 for the Malaysia Cup.

International career
In August 2016, Fakrul Aiman was called up to the Malaysian national team for the matches against Indonesia. He made his debut for the senior team in the match as a 77th-minute substitute for Mohd Amri Yahyah, as Malaysia lost 3–0.

Career statistics

Club

International

Honour

Club
Kuala Lumpur City
 Malaysia Cup: 2021

 AFC Cup runner-up: 2022

References

External links
 
 Fakrul Aiman Profile at Metafootball

1989 births
Living people
People from Kelantan
Malaysian people of Malay descent
Malaysian footballers
Malaysia international footballers
Association football wingers
Malaysia Premier League players
Malaysia Super League players
Negeri Sembilan FA players
PKNS F.C. players
PDRM FA players
Felda United F.C. players
Kuala Lumpur City F.C. players